Muhammad Ahmed Zuberi (2 July 1920  12 December 2010) also known as Muhammad Aziz Zuberi, and M. A. Zuberi, was a Pakistani journalist who was the founder and editor-in-chief of the Pakistani financial and business daily newspaper, Business Recorder.

Early life
Muhammad Ahmed Zuberi was born on 2 July 1920 at Marehra, United Provinces, British India.

Career
He started his career by joining Dawn newspaper, then the official newspaper of the All-India Muslim League, in December 1945 in Delhi, at the request of Muhammad Ali Jinnah and worked for this newspaper for 20 years in different capacities. After the independence of Pakistan in 1947, when Dawn newspaper started publication from Karachi, Zuberi started working there as a senior sub-editor. 

After retirement from Dawn newspaper, he wanted to fulfill his lifelong dream of launching a financial newspaper  
Business Recorder in 1965, also based in Karachi. This was the country's first newspaper dedicated to news coverage of finance and economy. It was well received by the public and its readership kept growing as years went by. Zuberi also was a founding member of the  Council of Pakistan Newspaper Editors (CPNE). During his long career in journalism, he represented Pakistan at different international forums  Commonwealth Press Union, United Nations and the World Bank. He was also Patron-in-Chief of the TV channel Aaj News and AAJ TV.

Zuberi, as a negotiator with the Government of Pakistan authorities for All Pakistan Newspapers Society and the Council of Pakistan Newspaper Editors, also played a crucial role in safeguarding the rights of journalists.

Awards and recognition
Sitara-i-Imtiaz (Star of Excellence) Award in journalism by the President of Pakistan in 2003.
Gold Mercury International Award (Italy)

Death and legacy
Zuberi died on 12 December 2010 at age 90 in Karachi, Pakistan. His burial was planned in the compound of Abdullah Shah Ghazi Graveyard at Clifton, Karachi. Among the survivors were three sons and two daughters and a number of grand children.

Zuberi was widely considered to be a pioneer of economic and financial journalism in Pakistan.

References

1920 births
2010 deaths
Pakistani male journalists
Pakistani newspaper founders
Pakistani newspaper editors
Recipients of Sitara-i-Imtiaz
Pakistani media personalities
Pakistani business executives